Miloš Plavšić (born 4 April 1990) is a Serbian professional footballer who plays as a central midfielder for Inđija.

Club career
Born in Vrbas, Plavšić passed the youth school of Vojvodina. After youth categories, Plavšić played as a senior with lower league clubs Veternik, Cement Beočin, Borac Novi Sad, Kikinda, Vujić Voda and ČSK Čelarevo, and was also a member of Hajduk Kula for a period.

In 2013, Plavšić moved to Slovak side Iskra Borčice, where he stayed as a club member until 2016, also working in a butcher shop with some other teammates. In summer 2016, he joined ČSK Čelarevo for the second time. After he scored 4 goals on 14 First League caps, also playing a cup match against Red Star Belgrade, Plavšić signed a professional contract with Novi Pazar until the end of the 2016–17 Serbian SuperLiga season.

In the summer of 2017, Plavšić moved to Radnik Surdulica. Playing just 4 matches at total under coach Simo Krunić, Plavšić decided to terminate the contract in mid-season. In early 2018, Plavšić joined Inđija. After Inđija, he also played for TSC from 2018 to 2019, with whom he won the 2018–19 Serbian First League and got promoted to the Serbian SuperLiga.

On 24 June 2019, Plavšić signed a two year contract with Premier League of Bosnia and Herzegovina club Radnik Bijeljina. He made his official debut for Radnik on 11 July 2019, in a 2–0 home win against Spartak Trnava in the 2019–20 UEFA Europa League first qualifying round, coming in for Dejan Maksimović as a 78th minute substitute. Plavšić played his first league game for Radnik in a 2–1 home win against Čelik Zenica on 25 September 2019. His first scored goal for the club came on 28 September 2019, in a 1–4 away league win against Zvijezda 09. Plavšić left Radnik in June 2020 after his contract with the club expired.

Honours
TSC Bačka Topola
Serbian First League: 2018–19

References

External links
 
 

1990 births
Living people
People from Vrbas, Serbia
Association football midfielders
Serbian footballers
Serbian expatriate footballers
Expatriate footballers in Slovakia
Serbian expatriate sportspeople in Slovakia
Expatriate footballers in Bosnia and Herzegovina
Serbian expatriate sportspeople in Bosnia and Herzegovina
FK Iskra Borčice players
2. Liga (Slovakia) players
AFC Nové Mesto nad Váhom players
FK Veternik players
FK Cement Beočin players
FK Palić players
OFK Kikinda players
FK ČSK Čelarevo players
FK Novi Pazar players
FK Radnik Surdulica players
FK Inđija players
FK TSC Bačka Topola players
FK Radnik Bijeljina players
FK Jagodina players
FK Zlatibor Čajetina players
Serbian First League players
Serbian SuperLiga players
Premier League of Bosnia and Herzegovina players